Ignalina is a city in eastern Lithuania. It is known as a tourist destination in the Aukštaitija National Park. Ignalina is also famous for the Ignalina Nuclear Power Plant in nearby Visaginas.

Legend 
It is said that Ignalina has got its name from two lovers Lina, daughter of duke Budrys, and Ignas, captive of the crusaders, whom people cursed and drowned in Ilgis Lake. Lina and Ignas are quite popular Lithuanian names.

History
Archeological findings and artefacts - mounds show that people lived in the territory of Ignalina already in 9th century. It is supposed that the territory of Ignalina earlier belonged to the ancient land of Nalšia, which was mentioned in 1229–1298. The toponyms and hidronyms demonstrate that it was inhabited by the Baltic tribe Selonians.

Even though there is archeological evidence that people lived in Ignalina area in the Stone Age, Ignalina was mentioned only in 1840. It started to grow only after the Warsaw – Saint Petersburg Railway was built in 1860. It is regarded as one of the new industrial cities.

After World War I, the area was disputed between Poland and Lithuania. It was occupied by troops of Lucjan Żeligowski, and internationally recognized as part of the Second Polish Republic in 1923. Nonetheless, Lithuania continued to claim this territory. Before September 1939, Ignalina (Ignalino) was situated in the Wilno Voivodeship.

Following the invasion of Poland, Ignalina became the capital of Ignalina eldership. More than half of the population was Jewish, 1200 people before the Holocaust.
During World War II, in 1941, Jews were imprisoned in a ghetto and exploited through forced labour. They are later murdered in mass executions.

In 1950 city become a capital of Ignalina District Municipality in Vilnius County. In 1995 Ignalina District Municipality become a part of Utena County.

Sports
Lithuanian Winter Sports Center is located in Ignalina near Šiekštys or Žaliasis (Green) Lake. During the winter Sports Center offers mountain skiing, snowboarding, ski equipment rental services, ski lifts, freeskiing instructors. In the summer there are boats or water bikes rental, tracks for roller skates, mountain bikes.

Also, there is the shooting range, Sports and Entertainment Center, “Žuvėdra” amusement park.

In Ignalina, there are organizing pedestrian, hiking, bicycle and car routes in the interesting places. In the summer there are popular kayak, boat or water bikes trips.

Ignalina used to be the main ski jumping venue in Lithuania until the 1970s when this sport was discontinued in the country.

Nature and geography
Ignalina located in the Aukštaitija National Park. It is a town above 9 lakes.

Ignalina is surrounded by woods and waters. Town takes pride in nine lakes named Gavys, Gavaitis, Ilgys, Šiekštys, Mekšrinis, Paplovinis, Palaukinis, Agarinis and Gulbinis.

In the Ignalina District Municipality there are more than 200 lakes.

Places of interest 
In Ignalina and around the town there are more than 130 interesting places to visit. For example, Ignalina Regional Museum, Paliesius Manor, Monument to Ignas and Lina, Palūšė St. Joseph's Church, Bell Tower, and Chapel, which is a Cultural Monument built in the second half of XVIII century, Beekeeping Museum in Stripeikiai, which is the only beekeeping museum in Lithuania, etc.

In some places there are organizing educational programs and special showcases, such as the baking of Šakotis in the restaurant "Romnesa“.

Festivals 
In Ignalina, there are traditional festivals including the opening and closing of the summer season, the biannual festival "Ežerų sietuva", spring and autumn fairs, etc.

Education institutions
 Ignalina Česlovas Kudaba Gymnasium
 Ignalina school-kindergarten "Šaltinėlis"
 Ignalina Mikas Petrauskas music school

Notable people
 Jonas Kindurys (b. 1946), architect, diplomat
 Arūnas Bubnys (b. 1961), historian
 Mantas Strolia (b. 1986), skier
 Algimantas Šalna (b. 1960), biathlete
 Ričardas Griaznovas (b. 1973), biathlete
 Igoris Ščekočichinas (b. 1980), biathlete
Tomas Kaukėnas (b. 1990), biathlete
Diana Rasimovičiūtė (b. 1984), biathlete
Modestas Vaičiulis (b. 1989), skier
 Aurelija Tamašauskaitė (b. 1999), swimmer
 Valdas Ozarinskas (b. 1961), architect

Twin towns – sister cities

Ignalina is twinned with:
 Büren, Germany
 Østfold, Norway
 Prachatice, Czech Republic
 Serock, Poland

References

External links

 City official website 
 Česlovas Kudaba progymnasium official website 
 Mikas Petrauskas music school official website
 Gymnasium official website
 School-kindergarten "Šaltinėlis" official website 

 
Cities in Utena County
Cities in Lithuania
Municipalities administrative centres of Lithuania
Ski areas and resorts in Lithuania
Sventsyansky Uyezd
Wilno Voivodeship (1926–1939)
Holocaust locations in Lithuania
Ignalina District Municipality